Electric Dreams may refer to:

Music
 Electric Dreams (Dan Lacksman album), 2013
 Electric Dreams (John McLaughlin with The One Truth Band album) , 1979
 Electric Dreams (Slinkee Minx album), 2007
 Electric Dreams (soundtrack), from the 1984 film of the same name
 Electric Dreams, 2017 opera by Matthew Shlomowitz
 "Electric Dream", a 2021 song by Pixey

Film and TV
 Electric Dreams (film), a 1984 film directed by Steven Barron
 Electric Dreams (2009 TV series), a 2009 UK documentary series
 Electric Dreams (2017 TV series), a 2017 TV series based on the works of Philip K. Dick

Other uses
 Electric Dreams Software, a UK video game publisher

See also
 Electronic Dream (2011 album) debut album of AraabMuzik
 "Together in Electric Dreams", a 1984 song by Philip Oakey and Giorgio Moroder